Amoghavajra (705–774) was a prolific translator who became one of the most politically powerful Buddhist monks in Chinese history and is acknowledged as one of the Eight Patriarchs of the Doctrine in Shingon Buddhism.

Life
Born in Samarkand of an Indian merchant father and a mother of Sogdian origin, he went to China at age 10 after his father's death. In 719, he was ordained into the sangha by Vajrabodhi and became his disciple. After all foreign monks were expelled from China in 741, he and some associates went on a pilgrimage to gather texts, visiting Sri Lanka, Indochina and India. During this voyage, he apparently met Nagabodhi, Vajrabodhi's master, and studied the Tattvasaṃgraha Tantra at length. He returned to China in 746 with some five hundred volumes. 

In 750, he left the court to join the military governorship of General Geshu Han of the Tang dynasty, for whom he conducted large-scale tantric initiations at his field headquarters. In 754, he translated the first portion of the Tattvasaṃgraha Tantra texts (Taishō Tripiṭaka. 865), central to the Outer Tantras of Vajrayana Buddhism, which became one of his most significant accomplishments. He regarded its teachings as the most effective method for attaining enlightenment yet devised, and incorporated its basic schema in a number of writings.

Amoghavajra was captured during the An Lushan Rebellion but in 757 was freed by loyalist forces, whereupon he performed rites to purify the capital and consolidate the security of the Tang state. Two years later, he initiated the emperor Emperor Suzong of Tang as a chakravartin. 

Amoghavajra assisted the Tang dynasty state against the An Lushan rebellion. He carried out Vajrayana rituals which were ostensibly effective in supernaturally attacking and destroying An Lushan's army including the death of one of An Lushan's generals, Zhou Zhiguang.

In 765, Amoghavajra used his new rendition of the Humane King Sutra in an elaborate ritual to counter the advance of a 200,000-strong army of Tibetan and Uyghurs which was poised to invade Chang'an. Its leader, Pugu Huai'en, dropped dead in camp and his forces dispersed.

The opulent Jinge Temple on Mount Wutai was completed in 767, a pet project of Amoghavajra, one of his many efforts to promote the bodhisattva Mañjuśrī as the protector of China. Amoghavajra continued to perform rites to avert disaster at the request of Emperor Daizong of Tang.

On his death in 774, three days of mourning were officially declared, and he posthumously received various exalted titles. The Chinese monks Huilang, Huiguo and Huilin were among his most prominent successors. Seventy-seven texts were translated by Amoghavajra according to his own account, though many more, including original compositions, are ascribed to him in the Chinese canons.

References

Further reading
 Astley, Ian (1987). The Rishukyo, a translation and commentary in the light of modern Japanese scholarship, PhD thesis, The University of Leeds

External links
Digital Dictionary of Buddhism (log in with userID "guest")
A review of Chinese Esoteric Buddhism: Amoghavajra and the Ruling Elite, by Geoffrey C. Goble

8th-century Buddhist monks
Chinese Buddhists
Tang dynasty Buddhists
705 births
774 deaths
Tang dynasty Buddhist monks
Tang dynasty translators
Indian emigrants to China
Shingon Buddhism
Buddhist translators
Vajrayana Buddhists
8th-century translators
Buddhist monks from the Western Regions
Sanskrit–Chinese translators